Laktionov Island is an island  long, lying  northeast of Jurva Point, Renaud Island, in the Biscoe Islands of Antarctica. It was first accurately shown on an Argentine government chart of 1957. The island was named by the UK Antarctic Place-Names Committee in 1959 after Aleksandr F. Laktionov (died 1965), a Soviet sea ice specialist in the Arctic and Antarctic Research Institute, Leningrad, 1927–65, who became head of the Department of Oceanography, Ice Forecasting and River Mouths.

See also 
 List of Antarctic and sub-Antarctic islands

References

Islands of the Biscoe Islands